QHHS may refer to:

 Quakers Hill High School in Quakers Hill, New South Wales, Australia
 Quartz Hill High School in Quartz Hill, California